Abdul Ali Sabri Mohamed Raheem (born 5 January 1963) is a Sri Lankan politician and Member of Parliament.

Raheem was born on 5 January 1963. He is the All Ceylon Makkal Congress' organiser for Puttalam District.

Raheem contested the 2020 parliamentary election as a Muslim National Alliance electoral alliance candidate in Puttalam District and was elected to the Parliament of Sri Lanka.

He voted in favor of 20 Amentment which brought  by the Sri Lanka Podujana Peramuna to strengthen the president.

References

1963 births
All Ceylon Makkal Congress politicians
Living people
Members of the 16th Parliament of Sri Lanka
Sri Lankan Moor politicians
Sri Lankan Muslims